Arthur Hughes (1883 – 18 December 1962) was an English professional footballer who played as a forward for various clubs in the 1900s.

Playing career
Born in Birkenhead, he started his career with his local club Birkenhead F.C. before joining Tranmere Rovers. In May 1907, he moved to Bolton Wanderers for a season (in which he failed to make a first team appearance) before moving to the south coast to join Southern League Southampton in the summer of 1908.

He was recruited by Southampton to act as cover for George Smith, but shortly after the move Smith collapsed and died in July. Hughes immediately took Smith's place on a pre-season tour of Europe. For Hughes the tour was a great success, scoring freely including a hat-trick against The Hague.

Hughes started the 1908–09 season as centre-forward in spectacular fashion with ten goals in his first ten games, including a hat-trick in the 6–0 defeat of Luton Town on 12 September 1908. According to Holley & Chalk's "The Alphabet of the Saints" Hughes had "fine ball control" and "equally happy using either foot...he distributed the ball with panache". A serious leg injury sustained in the match at Watford on 21 November (in which he scored the only goal) sidelined him for several matches. Although he returned to first team action in January he was unable to regain his early season form but still finished the season as the club's top scorer with 15 goals from 21 appearances.

At the end of the season he decided to return to Lancashire where he signed for Manchester City although he never made an appearance for their first team.

After retiring from football, he took up employment as a bricklayer working for the Birkenhead municipal corporation.

References

1883 births
1962 deaths
Sportspeople from Birkenhead
English footballers
Tranmere Rovers F.C. players
Bolton Wanderers F.C. players
Southampton F.C. players
Manchester City F.C. players
Southern Football League players
British bricklayers
Association football forwards